Booter may refer to:

 Self-booting disk, software loaded directly at the bootup of a computer, without the help of an operating system
 Booter, a tool for performing a denial-of-service attack
 Marc Hill (born 1952), a Major League Baseball player nicknamed The Booter

See also
 Boot (disambiguation)